Parapolystichum is a genus of ferns in the family Dryopteridaceae, subfamily Elaphoglossoideae, in the Pteridophyte Phylogeny Group classification of 2016 (PPG I). The genus is mainly native to the tropics, although its range extends to southeastern Australia.

Taxonomy
The taxon was first described as the section Parapolystichum of the genus Polystichum by Keyserling in 1873. It was raised to the rank of genus by Ching in 1940.

Species
, the Checklist of Ferns and Lycophytes of the World recognized the following species:

Parapolystichum acuminatum (Houlston) Labiak, Sundue & R.C.Moran
Parapolystichum acutum (Kuntze) Labiak, Sundue & R.C.Moran
Parapolystichum barterianum (Hook.) Rouhan
Parapolystichum boivinii (Baker) Rouhan
Parapolystichum calanthum (Endl.) J.J.S.Gardner & Nagalingum
Parapolystichum confine (C.Chr.) Labiak, Sundue & R.C.Moran
Parapolystichum coriaceosquamatum (Rakotondr.) Rouhan
Parapolystichum currorii (Mett. ex Kuhn) Rouhan
Parapolystichum effusum (Sw.) Ching
Parapolystichum excultum (Mett.) Labiak, Sundue & R.C.Moran
Parapolystichum fideleae (Rakotondr.) Rouhan
Parapolystichum glabellum (A.Cunn.) Labiak, Sundue & R.C.Moran
Parapolystichum grayi (D.L.Jones) J.J.S.Gardner & Nagalingum
Parapolystichum hornei (Baker) Rouhan
Parapolystichum kermadecense (Perrie & Brownsey) Perrie & L.D.Sheph.
Parapolystichum manongarivense (Rakotondr.) Rouhan
Parapolystichum microsorum (Endl.) Labiak, Sundue & R.C.Moran
Parapolystichum munitum (Mett.) Labiak, Sundue & R.C.Moran
Parapolystichum nigritianum (Baker) Rouhan
Parapolystichum novoguineense (Holttum) Sundue & Testo
Parapolystichum pacificum (Tindale) J.J.S.Gardner & Nagalingum
Parapolystichum perrierianum (C.Chr.) Rouhan
Parapolystichum pseudoperrierianum (Tardieu) Rouhan
Parapolystichum rufescens (Blume) Labiak, Sundue & R.C.Moran
Parapolystichum smithianum (Tindale) Labiak, Sundue & R.C.Moran
Parapolystichum subsimile (Hook.) Rouhan
Parapolystichum tinarooense (Tindale) Labiak, Sundue & R.C.Moran
Parapolystichum villosissimum C.Sánchez & Labiak
Parapolystichum vogelii (Hook.) Rouhan
Parapolystichum windsorense (D.L.Jones & B.Gray) Labiak, Sundue & R.C.Moran

References

Dryopteridaceae
Fern genera